Toby Daryl Wynn (born November 26, 1975) is an American formercollege women's basketball coach, serving from 2018 to 2023 at Emporia State University. and from 2005 to 2018, for Seward County Community College, where he led the Lady Saints to four conference championships, 20-plus wins for 13 consecutive years, and appeared in the NJCAA Tournament in four seasons.

Career

Early coaching career 
Wynn, born in Booker, Texas, began his coaching career in Balko, Oklahoma at the local high school while attending Oklahoma State University–Stillwater. He coached there for two years before moving to Kansas to become the Liberal High School coach in 2001. He left in 2004. Wynn served as an assistant coach at Seward County Community College under Jim Littell, current head coach at Oklahoma State, before Littell left for Oklahoma State.

Seward County Community College 
Wynn coached at Seward County from 2005 until 2018. During his time at Seward County, Wynn posted a  overall record,  conference record, and has won four conference regular season championships, two Region VI Tournament championships, and one National Junior College Athletic Association District F Coach of the Year in 2007.

Emporia State University 
On April 6, 2018, Wynn was announced as the seventh head coach at for Emporia State Lady Hornets basketball, an NCAA Division II school. In his first year at Emporia State, Wynn lead the Lady Hornets to a 22–9 overall, 13–6 conference finish, landing them tied for fifth place in conference play. Wynn resigned after the 2022–23 season, finishing the season with a 14–15 overall record, 9–13 conference record.

Head coach record

References

External links
 Emporia State profile

1975 births
Living people
American women's basketball coaches
Emporia State Lady Hornets basketball coaches
Oklahoma State University alumni
Basketball coaches from Texas
People from Booker, Texas